This is a list of local nature reserves in Scotland.

 Aberlady Bay
 Ardeer Quarry
 Arnhall Moss
 Balquhidderock Wood
 Birnie and Gaddon Lochs
 Bishop Loch
 Bonnyfield Nature Park
 Braedale Hill
 Broughty Ferry
 Brownsburn
 Burdiehouse Burn Valley Park
 Cambusnethan Woodland
 Cammo Estate
 Cardowan Moss
 Carron Dams
 Castle and Hightae Lochs
 Cathkin Braes
 Catrine Voes and Woodlands
 Commonhead Moss
 Corstorphine Hill
 Coul Den
 Coves Community Park
 Cullaloe
 Dalbeath Marsh
 Dams to Darnley
 Dawsholm Park
 Den of Maidencraig
 Donmouth
 Duchess Wood
 Dumbreck Marsh
 Durrockstock Park
 Easter Craiglockhart Hill
 Easter Inch Moss and Seafield Law
 Eden Estuary
 Findhorn Bay
 Garscadden Wood
 Gartcosh
 Gartmorn Dam
 Gillingshill Reservoir
 Greenhead Moss and Perchy Pond
 Hamilton Claypits
 Happy Valley
 Hermitage of Braid / Blackford Hill
 Hogganfield Park
 Holy Loch
 Inner Tay Estuary
 Jenny's Well
 Kilmardinny Loch
 Kincorth Hill
 Kingshill
 Kinneil Foreshore
 Langlands Moss
 Lenzie Moss
 Lin Park
 Loch Stiapabhat
 Malls Mire
 Meadows Yard
 Merkinch
 Merklands
 Montrose Basin
 Mosswater
 Mull Head
 Paisley Moss
 Ravelston Woods
 Ravenswood
 Robroyston Park
 Scotstown Moor
 Stevenston Beach
 Straiton Pond
 The Saltings
 Torry Bay
 Trottick Mill Ponds
 Waters of Philorth
 Wemyss Bay Woodland
 Wigtown Bay

References

 NatureScot

See also
 List of local nature reserves in England
 List of local nature reserves in Wales

 
 
Local